The Boulder County Courthouse is a historic building on Pearl Street in Boulder, Colorado, built in 1933. The courthouse is a contributing property to the Downtown Boulder Historic District, listed on the National Register of Historic Places in 1980. In 2018, additional information about the building was added to the documentation of the district.

History 
The original courthouse was built in 1882 by F.E. Edbrooke, but was destroyed by a fire in 1932.  The present courthouse was re-built on the same site in the following year. 
It is a five-story building designed by architect Glen H. Huntington, son of prolific Denver architect Glen Wood Huntington, in WPA Moderne style (a restrained form of Art Deco architecture).  It features vertical lines, a tower, and little ornamentation.

The courthouse no longer houses the actual courts for Boulder County, but it remains the seat of county government.

It was one of the first courthouses in the US to issue same-sex marriage licenses in 1975, when Boulder County clerk Clela Rorex issued licenses to 6 same-sex couples.

In 1980, it was listed on the National Register of Historic Places as one of 125 contributing buildings in the Downtown Boulder Historic District.

In 2018, the historic district's official documentation was updated "to recognize an additional area of significance of Social History for the Boulder County Courthouse, as well as the district generally, for association with the first same-sex marriage licenses issued in Colorado and the civil rights struggles of Lesbian, Gay, Bisexual, Transgender and Queer (LGBTQ) people."

References

History of LGBT civil rights in the United States
National Register of Historic Places in Boulder County, Colorado
Courthouses on the National Register of Historic Places in Colorado
Downtown Boulder Historic District
WPA Moderne architecture